Aql bi'l fil is a kind of intellect in the Islamic philosophy. This level deals with readiness of soul for acquiring the forms without receiving them again.

Historical background 
Al Kindi also pointed out to a kind of intellect could reach from the state of potentiality, to the state of actuality. Farabi pointed out the first level of actualization of intellect is the potential intellect. the second stage is to Aql bi'l fil or actual intellect. The actual intellect reflects upon itself. in other word when intellect acquired forms and categories, reflects upon itself, this action called as actual intellect. of course Groff classify the actual intellect as third. meanwhile Farabi used the term Aql bi'l fil for intellect in full exercise of its powers. also Iji, known theologian, referred to the actual intellect versus potential. it seems that the term Aql bi'l fil  for Avicenna is comparable with A ruh Al Aqli for Al Ghazali.

Concept 
If the intellect acquired its knowledge so that it could access them any time it wants then the intellect called as actual intellect. in this degree, aql is in act which is compared to the absolute potency of the material Aql and has a first form of knowledge. for Farabi, the potential intellect becomes the actual. in fact the most important task of the actual intellect is to acquire secondary intelligible from primary intelligible and ready to employ them all at any time.this stage has similarities with al-‘aql bi al-malaka. but its task is so more. actual intellect also called as cognitive and theoretical. this knod of intellect counted as a journey from general knowledge to special knowledge. this intellect also is the second perfection of intellect. However, this kind of reason allows to human free themselves from illusion and errors.

See also 

Aql Bil Quwwah
'Aql

References

Sources
 

Islamic philosophy
Islamic terminology